Francis Charles McKenna (9 December 1902 – 1947) was an English professional footballer who played as an inside forward.

References

1902 births
1947 deaths
Footballers from Newcastle upon Tyne
English footballers
Association football inside forwards
Swan Hunter F.C. players
Spennymoor United F.C. players
Wallsend F.C. players
Grimsby Town F.C. players
Fulham F.C. players
Norwich City F.C. players
Newport County A.F.C. players
Walker Celtic F.C. players
Wrexham A.F.C. players
English Football League players
Date of death missing